Ballymore is a civil parish and townland (of 676 acres) in County Armagh, Northern Ireland. It is situated in the historic barony of Orior Lower.

Towns and villages
The civil parish contains the villages of Acton, Poyntzpass and Tandragee.

Townlands
The civil parish contains the following townlands:

Acton
Aghantaraghan
Auglish
Ballyargan
Ballymore
Ballynagreagh
Ballynaleck
Ballyreagh
Ballysheil Beg
Ballysheil More
Brannock
Cargans
Carrickbrack
Clare
Cloghoge
Coolyhid
Corcrum
Corernagh
Corlust
Crew Beg
Crew More
Cullentragh
Demoan
Derryallen
Druminargal
Druminure
Drumnaglontagh
Drumnaleg
Federnagh
Glasdrumman
Lisbane
Lisnagree
Lisnakea
Lisraw
Mavemacullen
Monclone
Moodoge
Mullaghglass
Mullanary
Mullantur
Shaneglish
Skegatillida
Tannyoky
Terryhoogan
Tullyhugh
Tullylinn
Tullymacann
Tullynacross

See also
List of civil parishes of County Armagh

References